Aktaş is a village in the Amasya District, Amasya Province, Turkey. Its population is 50 (2021).

Demographics
In 2012 the village had a population of 45 people. In 2000 it had 55 people.

References

Villages in Amasya District